The Shona people are part of the Bantu ethnic group native to Southern Africa, primarily living in Zimbabwe where they form the majority of the population, as well as Mozambique, South Africa, and a worldwide diaspora including global celebrities such as Thandiwe Newton. There are five major Shona language/dialect clusters : Karanga, Zezuru, Korekore, Manyika and Ndau.

Regional classification 
The Shona people are grouped according to the dialect of the language they speak. Their estimated population is 16.6 million:
 Karanga or Southern Shona (about 8.5 million people)
 Zezuru or Central Shona (5.2 million people)
 Korekore or Northern Shona (1.7 million people)
 Manyika tribe or Eastern Shona (1.2 million) in Zimbabwe (861,000) and Mozambique (173,000).
 Ndau in Mozambique (1,580,000) and Zimbabwe (800,000).

History
During the 11th century, the Karanga people formed kingdoms on the Zimbabwe plateau. Construction, then, began on Great Zimbabwe; the capital of the kingdom of Zimbabwe. The Torwa dynasty ruled the kingdom of Butua, and the kingdom of Mutapa preceded the Rozvi Empire (which lasted into the 19th century).

Brother succeeded brother in the dynasties, leading to civil wars which were exploited by the Portuguese during the 16th century. The kings ruled a number of chiefs, sub-chiefs and headmen.

The kingdoms were replaced by new groups who moved onto the plateau. The Ndebele destroyed the weakened Rozvi Empire during the 1830s; the Portuguese gradually encroached on the kingdom of Mutapa, which extended to the Mozambique coast after it provided valued exports (particularly gold) for Swahili, Arab and East Asian traders. The Pioneer Column of the British South Africa Company established the colony of Rhodesia, sparking the First Matabele War which led to the complete annexation of Mashonaland; the Portuguese colonial government in Mozambique fought the remnants of the kingdom of Mutapa until 1902. The Shona people were also a part of the Bantu migration where they are one of the largest Bantu ethnic groups in sub Saharan Africa.

Language 

The dialect groups of Shona developed among dispersed tribes over a long period of time, and further groups of immigrants have contributed to this diversity. Although "standard" Shona is spoken throughout Zimbabwe, dialects help identify a speaker's town or village. Each Shona dialect is specific to a sub-group.

In 1931, during his attempt to reconcile the dialects into a single standard Shona language, Clement Doke identified five groups and subdivisions:
 The Korekore (or Northern Shona), including Taυara, Shangwe, Korekore, Goυa, Budya, the Korekore of Urungwe, the Korekore of Sipolilo, Tande, Nyongwe of "Darwin", and Pfungwe of Mrewa
 The Zezuru group, including Shawasha, Haraυa, another Goυa, Nohwe, Hera, Njanja, Mbire, Nobvu, Vakwachikwakwa, Vakwazvimba, Tsunga
 The Karanga group, including Duma, Jena, Mari, Goυera, Nogoυa, and Nyubi
 The Manyika group, including Hungwe, Manyika themselves, Teυe, Unyama, Karombe, Nyamuka, Bunji, Domba, Nyatwe, Guta, Bvumba, Here, Jindwi, and Boca
 The Ndau group (mostly in Mozambique), including Ndau, Garwe, Danda, and Shanga
The Ndau dialect, which is somewhat mutually intelligible with the main Shona dialects, has click sounds which do not occur in standard Shona. Ndau has a wealth of Nguni words as a result of the Gaza Nguni occupation of their ancestral land in the 19th century.

Agriculture
The Shona have traditionally practiced subsistence agriculture. They grew sorghum, beans, African groundnuts, and after the Columbian Exchange, pumpkins; sorghum was also largely replaced by maize after the crop's introduction. The Shona also keep cattle and goats, since livestock are an important food reserve during droughts.

Mining 
Precolonial Shona states derived substantial revenue from the export of mining products, particularly gold and copper.

Culture

Clothing 
Traditional clothing were usually animal skins that covered the front and the back, and were called 'mhapa' and shashiko.' These later evolved when the Shona people started trading for cloth with other groups, such as the Tsonga, and native cloths began to be manufactured.

 Music 

Shona traditional music's most important instruments are ngoma drums and the mbira. The drums vary in size and shape, depending on the type of music they are accompanying. How they are played also depends on drum size and music type. Large drums are typically played with sticks, and smaller drums with an open palm; the small drum used for the 'amabhiza dance is played with a hand and a stick. The stick rubs, or scratches, the drum to produce a screeching sound.

The mbira has become a national instrument of sorts in Zimbabwe. It has a number of variants, including the nhare, mbira dzavadzimu, the Mbira Nyunga Nyunga, njari mbira, and matepe. The mbira is played at religious and secular gatherings, and different mbiras have different purposes. The 22–24-key mbira dzavadzimu is used to summon spirits, and the 15-key Mbira Nyunga Nyunga is taught from primary school to university. Shona music also uses percussion instruments such as the marimba (similar to a xylophone), shakers ('hosho'), leg rattles, wooden clappers ('makwa'), and the chikorodzi,' a notched stick played with another stick.

 Arts 

Both historically and in contemporary art, the Shona are known for their work in stone sculpture, which re-emerged during the 1940s. Shona sculpture developed during the eleventh century and peaked in the thirteenth and fourteenth centuries, before beginning a slow decline until their mid-20th-century rediscovery. Most of the sculptures are made from sedimentary-stone (such as soapstone) and depict birds or humans;  though some are made with harder stone such as serpentinite. During the 1950s, Zimbabwean artists began carving stone sculptures for sale to European art collectors; these sculptures quickly became popular and were bought and exhibited at art museums around the world. Many of the sculptures depict the transformation of spirits into animals or vice versa, and some are more abstract. Many Zimbabwean artists carve wood and stone to sell to tourists. 

Pottery is also a traditionally practiced craft, with the storage and serving pots being the most decorative, contrasted with those used for cooking. In Shona clay  earthenware pots are known as hari.

 Architecture 
Traditional Shona housing ('musha') are round huts arranged around a cleared yard ('ruvanze). Each hut has a specific function, such as acting as a kitchen or a lounge.

Cuisine 
Sorghum and maize are used to prepare the staple dish, a thickened porridge ('sadza'), and the traditional beer known as hwahwa.

Religion 

Shona Religion

The traditional religion of Shona people is centred on Mwari (God), also known as Musikavanhu (Creator of man/people) or Nyadenga (one who lives high up). God communicates with his people on earth directly or through chosen holy people. At times God uses natural phenomena and the environment to communicate with his people. Some of the chosen people have powers to prophecy, heal and bless. People can also communicate with God directly through prayer. Deaths are not losses but a promotion to the stage where they can represent the living through the clan spirits. When someone dies, according to Shona religion, they join the spiritual world. In the spiritual world, they can enjoy their afterlife or become bad spirits. No one wants to be a bad spirit, so during life, people are guided by a culture of unhu so that when they die, they enjoy their afterlife. The Bira ceremony, which often lasts all night, summons spirits for guidance and intercession. Shona religion teaches that the only ones who can communicate with both the living and God are the ancestral spirits, or dzavadzimu.  Historically, colonialists and anthropologists wanted to undermine the Shona religion in favour of Christianity. Initially, they stated that Shona did not have a God. They denigrated the way the Shona had communicated with their God Mwari, the Shona way of worship, and chosen people among the Shona. The chosen people were treated as unholy and Shona prayer was labelled as pagan. When compared with Christianity, the Shona religious perspective of afterlife, holiness, worship and rules of life (unhu) are similar. 

Religious affiliation of Shona Peoples

Although sixty to eighty percent of the Shona people follow Christianity, Shona traditional religious beliefs are still present across the country. A small number of the population practice the Muslim faith, often brought about by immigrants from predominantly Malawi who practice Islam. There is also a small population of Jews.

Mutupo Identity Emblems
In Zimbabwe the Mutupo (plural Mitupo) (wrongly called totems by colonial missionaries and anthropologists) are a system of identifying clans and sub-clans, which are named after and signified by emblems, commonly indigenous animals. Mitupo have been used by the Shona people since their culture developed. They have provided a function in avoiding incest, and also build solidarity and identity. It could be compared to heraldry in European culture.  There are more than 25 mitupo in Zimbabwe. In marriage, mitupo help create a strong identity for children but it serves another function of ensuring that people marry someone they know. In Shona this is explained by the proverb rooranai vematongo which means 'marry or have a relationship with someone that you know'. However, as a result of colonisation, urban areas and migration resulted in people mixing and others having relationships of convenience with people they do not know. This results in unwanted pregnancies and also unwanted babies some of whom are dumped or abandoned. This may end up with children without mutupo. This phenomenon has resulted in numerous challenges for communities but also for the children who lack part of their identity. It is, however, possible for a child to be adopted and receive mutupo.

Notable Shona People

 Ovidy Karuru
 Khama Billiat
 Nehanda Charwe Nyakasikana

 Robert Gabriel Mugabe

 Herbert Chitepo

 Stella Chiweshe

 Chartwell Dutiro
 Tonderai Kasu

 Thomas Mapfumo
 Malachi Napa
 Strive Masiyiwa
 Paul Tangi Mhova Mkondo
 Emmerson Mnangagwa
 Tendai Mtawarira
 Oliver Mtukudzi
 Grace Mugabe

 Joice Mujuru
 Tinashe
 Solomon Mujuru
 Knowledge Musona
 Solomon Mutswairo
 Marvelous Nakamba
 Thandiwe Newton

 Jah Prayzah
 Shingai Shoniwa
 George Tawengwa
 Rekayi Tangwena
 Tererai Trent
 Tendayi Darikwa
 Morgan Tsvangirai

 Winky D

 Vitalis Zvinavashe
Kotaro Matsushima
 Andy Rinomhota
 Brendan Galloway
 Patrick Daka
 Divine Lunga
 Jonah Fabisch
 Danai Gurira

See also

Citations

Further reading
 "Arts and Culture in the 'Royal Residence (PDF). Journal of Pan African Studies, vol. 12, no. 3, Oct. 2018, pp. 141–149. .
 McEwen, Frank. "Shona Art Today". African Arts, vol. 5, no. 4, 1972, pp. 8–11. .
 
 Zilberg, Jonathan L. Zimbabwean Stone Sculpture: The Invention of a Shona Tradition, University of Illinois at Urbana-Champaign, Ann Arbor, 1996. .

External links

 
 Shona Translator
 Shona Dictionary
 "Shona" at the Encyclopædia Britannica

 
 
Indigenous peoples of Southern Africa